Megalobrimus parvus is a species of beetle in the family Cerambycidae. It was described by Stephan von Breuning in 1969. It is known from Cameroon.

References

Endemic fauna of Cameroon
Phrissomini
Beetles described in 1969